Baba Dayal  (1783-1855) born in Peshwar was a Sahajdhari Sikh whose main mission was to bring Sikhs back to the Adi Granth and Simran.

Sahib Hara Singh's younger son, *Dr. Man Singh Nirankari (1912- 2010), who retired as the principal of the Amritsar medical College, has continued popularizing the teachings of Baba Dayal Das. He is known throughout Punjab because of his newspaper columns, and because of the many books that he has written, including a few on Baba Dayal and the Nirankaris. He was instrumental in setting up the Nirnarki Gurudwara in Chandigarh, after partition. He brought with him from Pakistan a large number of Sikh manuscripts. He donated these to the *Government Museum and Art gallery in Chandigarh in order to encourage scholarly research. After his death, his grandson Angad Chowdhry is said to continue his work.

Further reading 

Sikh Twareekh / Harjinder Singh Dilgeer, in Punjabi (especially volume 3 has a comprehensive chapter of the Nirankari Movement).

Sikh History in 10 volumes / Harjinder Singh Dilgeer, in English (especially volume 4 has a comprehensive chapter of the Nirankari Movement).

Historical dictionary of Sikhism / W.H. McLeod.

Textual sources for the study of Sikhism / translated and edited by W.H. McLeod

Baba Dayal: A Crusader of True Sikhism / Ed. Dr. Man Singh Nirankari

External links
Political clashes
General overview
Mcleod Book index
Jstor Article Available Freely
Special edition on Sikh Sects
Differences between Nirankaris and Sant Nirankaris

1783 births
1855 deaths
Indian Sikhs